Noora Salem Jasim (born 27 November 1996) is a Nigerian-born Bahraini athlete competing primarily in the shot put. She represented her country at the 2017 World Championships without qualifying for the final.

International competitions

Personal bests

Outdoor
Shot put – 18.00 (Doha 2019) NR
Discus throw – 50.12 (Baku 2017) NR
Indoor
Shot put – 17.45 (Dobrich 2017) NR

References

1996 births
Living people
Bahraini female shot putters
World Athletics Championships athletes for Bahrain
Athletes (track and field) at the 2014 Asian Games
Athletes (track and field) at the 2018 Asian Games
Asian Games medalists in athletics (track and field)
Asian Games bronze medalists for Bahrain
Medalists at the 2018 Asian Games
Naturalized citizens of Bahrain
Nigerian emigrants to Bahrain
Islamic Solidarity Games competitors for Bahrain
Islamic Solidarity Games medalists in athletics